The Fire Alarm, Telegraph and Police Signaling Building, usually referred to just as the Signaling Building, is located on State Street in Troy, New York, United States. It is currently used as storage space by Rensselaer County.

It was built to implement a new combined fire and police "silent alarm" system in the early 1920s, using telephone wires instead of human bell-ringers. This represented the last step in Troy's efforts to prevent the devastating fires of the 19th century from destroying so much of the city again. It continued to be used for that purpose until 1968, and in 2003 it was listed on the National Register of Historic Places.

External links 
 Fire Alarm, Telegraph and Police Signaling Building

References

National Register of Historic Places in Troy, New York
Government buildings completed in 1922
Infrastructure completed in 1922
Buildings and structures in Troy, New York
Government buildings on the National Register of Historic Places in New York (state)
Telecommunications buildings on the National Register of Historic Places
Firefighting in New York (state)
Fire departments in New York (state)